Ludwig von Baldass (1887–1963) was an Austrian art historian, professor and acclaimed author who specialised in Early Netherlandish painting. He studied under Max Dvořák at the University of Vienna and began to lecture there in 1926, gaining the position of professor in 1934. Von Baldass' 1942 treatise on Hans Memling was instrumental in the re-evaluation of his artistic importance. Other publications include articles and books on Jan van Eyck (1952), Hieronymus Bosch (1953), Giorgione and Albrecht Altdorfer.

Following the Anschluss with Nazi Germany, von Baldass adhered to the Nazis' policy on the arts. When the Reich began a campaign of plundering works from Jewish collectors, members of the Rothschild family attempted to leave the country, taking their paintings with them. Von Baldass, acting as a faithful Nazi party member, resisted and frustrated their efforts in a bid to prevent the works from leaving Austria. As a result, most passed into the hands of the Nazi state. After the war, Louis Rothschild attempted to reclaim parts of his collection, but von Baldass made use of his influence and bargained that some pieces should stay in the care of the state Kunsthistorisches Museum, in return for the passage of a number of others back to the Rothschild family. De Rothschild was eventually and reluctantly forced to concede to these terms.

Von Baldass retired from lecturing in 1949 and devoted himself to writing; his most important works were published after 1952. He was married to Paula Wagner, a granddaughter of the architect Otto Wagner.

Publications
 Albrecht Altdorfer. Gallus Verlag, 1941
 Hans Memling. 1942
 Conrad Laib und die beiden Rueland Frueauf. V von Anton Schroll, 1946
 Jan van Eyck. Phaidon Press, 1952
 Hieronimus Bosch. Abrams, 1960
 Giorgione. Thames & Hudson, (posthumously) 1965

Notes 

Austrian art historians
1887 births
1963 deaths
Academic staff of the University of Vienna
Scholars of Dutch art
Scholars of Netherlandish art